Trachypachus slevini is a species of false ground beetle in the family Trachypachidae. It is found in North America.

References

Further reading

External links

 

Adephaga
Articles created by Qbugbot
Beetles described in 1925